The Cathedral of Saints Peter and Paul is a Russian Orthodox cathedral located in Petergof, Russia (also known as Peterhof).

Emperor Alexander II approved the design for the cathedral in 1882. It was designed by civil engineer Nikolai Sultanov in the Kievan style.  It was completed in 1905 but was closed in 1935 and seriously damaged in World War II when it was used to house artillery by German troops. The cathedral was eventually restored and services in the space resumed in 1990.

References

Russian Orthodox cathedrals in Russia
Cultural heritage monuments of regional significance in Saint Petersburg
Buildings and structures in Petergof